The Yamaha Y8950 is a sound chip, produced in 1984. It is also known as MSX-Audio as it was designed for inclusion in an expansion cartridge for the MSX personal computer.

The Y8950 is essentially a Yamaha YM3526 with an ADPCM encoder/decoder added on. It was introduced in three cartridge models:
Philips NMS-1205
Toshiba HX-MU900
Panasonic FS-CA1

Features

Compatible with the Yamaha YM3526 (OPL)
Nine voices of FM synthesis (using phase modulation)
Two sound-generation modes available: Simultaneous sounding of nine tones or 6 melodies and five rhythms (Compatible with the Character and Pattern Telephone Access Information Network (C.A.P.T.A.I.N.) system and teletex).
Built-in vibrato and AM oscillators
Built-in accelerated 4-bit ADPCM speech analysis/synthesis circuits
Possibility of connecting an external 256-kB RAM plus 256-kB ROM
Built-in 8-bit input/output ports for keyboard scanning
Built-in 4-bit general purpose I/O port
Two built-in general purpose timers
TTL compatible input/output
Si-gate CMOS LSI
5V single power supply
64-pin SDIP encapsulation (the same thing was done on the V9938)

Software Support

The Y8950 is supported by almost all software which contains music composed in SoundTracker, (Moonblaster, Oracle, Super Music Editor or Magic Music Module Combi, etc.). All these editors support the ADPCM sample unit.
Other software which makes use of the ADPCM sampler such as Trax Player by NOP (a program to play songs (samples) directly from disk, while loading) also supports it.

The majority of games made by Compile on the MSX were MSX-Audio compatible, although they didn't use the ADPCM sampler portion of the sound chip.

See also
List of sound chips
Yamaha OPL

References

The Ultimate MSX FAQ -  MSX-Audio Section (Retrieved on 2008-01-02).

External links
Frequently asked questions about MSX-music

Y8950